Diamond Tooth Gerties Gambling Hall is a casino in Dawson City, Yukon, Canada. It was first opened in 1971 by the Klondike Visitors Association, making it Canada's oldest casino. Gerties, as it is colloquially known, as well as most of Dawson City is reminiscent of the area's Klondike Gold Rush history. Patrons are treated to a daily vaudeville show inspired by one of Dawson's most famous dance hall stars from the Gold Rush era, Gertie Lovejoy, who had a diamond between her two front teeth.

Overview
Gerties is unique among casinos in Canada, being the only one where patrons can gamble, drink alcohol, and watch live entertainment in the same room. The only casino located in northern Canada,it is still operated by the Klondike Visitors Association, a non-profit organization. Revenues are re-invested back into the town to help preserve historic sites, produce local events, and to promote the Klondike. In 2015, it was declared a Municipal Heritage Site.

Arctic Brotherhood Hall
The building that houses Gerties was formerly known as Arctic Brotherhood Hall. It was built in 1901 in a mere three weeks by the Arctic Brotherhood, who were a fraternal social organization for men living in the northwest section of North America. Camp No.4 of the Arctic Brotherhood was formed in November 1899 in Dawson City. When it was completed, the building was regarded as the largest and grandest building in the northwest. In 1925, the Arctic Brotherhood ceased to exist and soon after the Fraternal Order of Eagles moved in. Eventually the building was turned into a community hall. In 1967, the building was renovated and briefly renamed to Centennial Hall in honour of Canada's 100th birthday. In 1971, the town leased the building to the Klondike Visitors Association, who were running casino nights on the S.S. Keno after they had obtained a special gambling license from the Government of Canada.

Games
Among the available games are blackjack ($3-$100 bets), roulette, poker, 64 slot machines, and red dog poker. They also have a special game called money wheel, which features Canadian bills.

See also 
 Diamond Tooth Lil, a Gold Rush-era American popular cultural icon of wealth and libertine burlesque

References

External links
Official website

Buildings and structures in Dawson City
Casinos in Yukon
Casinos completed in 1971
1971 establishments in Yukon
Buildings and structures completed in 1901